Muhammad Afzal may refer to:

 Muhammad Afzal (wrestler) (1939–2020), Pakistani Olympic wrestler
 Muhammad Afzal (politician) (born 1964), Pakistani politician in the Punjab
 Muhammad Afzal (athlete) (born 1967), Pakistani Olympic sprinter

See also
 
 Mohammad Afzal (disambiguation)